Ninase  is a village in Saaremaa Parish, Saare County in western Estonia.

Before the administrative reform in 2017, the village was in Mustjala Parish.

The Saaremaa Harbour is located in Ninase.

Ninase village is located on Ninase peninsula which highest cliff on the 1 km shoreline is 5 meters high. The surrounding nature and birds can be observed from the 12 m high tower next to the village.

References

External links
Saaremaa Harbour at Port of Tallinn's website

Villages in Saare County